Teihorangi Thomas Walden (born 25 May 1993) is a New Zealand rugby union player who currently plays as a midfield back for  in New Zealand's domestic Mitre 10 Cup and the  in the international Super Rugby competition.He also plays for the Rugby New York (Ironworkers) in Major League Rugby (MLR).

Early career

Walden is originally from New Plymouth and was schooled at Francis Douglas Memorial College in his hometown where he played first XV rugby.   During his schooldays, he was selected in the  schools side alongside future teammate Jackson Hemopo.   He moved south to Dunedin to attend university and at the same time began working his way through the  rugby structures; he was a member of their academy, played for their age group sides and also turned out for Southern in the local Otago rugby competition.

Senior career

In 2014 he established himself as a regular with 9 starts and 2 tries in what was a disappointing season overall for Otago, culminating in a 6th-place finish out of 7 teams.

Super Rugby

Some impressive performances in an under-performing Otago side brought him to the attention of Dunedin-based Super Rugby franchise, the  who named him as a member of their wider training group for the 2015 Super Rugby season.   2015 was to prove to be a memorable year for the Highlanders who lifted the Super Rugby title for the first time in their history, while for Walden, the presence of midfield backs such as Malakai Fekitoa, Richard Buckman, Jason Emery and Shaun Treeby meant he had to spend the year kicking his heels on the sidelines.   His Super Rugby debut came the following year in week 1 of the competition, a 33–31 defeat away to the Blues.   Overall he scored one try in 6 matches while still a wider training group member in 2016 and new Highlanders head coach, Tony Brown saw fit to promote him to the full squad for  2017.

International career

Walden was a member of the New Zealand Under-20 side which finished 4th in the 2013 IRB Junior World Championship in France, although he didn't get any game time during the tournament.

Super Rugby statistics

References

1993 births
New Zealand rugby union players
New Zealand Māori rugby union players
Rugby union centres
Otago rugby union players
Rugby union players from New Plymouth
People educated at Francis Douglas Memorial College
Highlanders (rugby union) players
Living people
Taranaki rugby union players
Hurricanes (rugby union) players
Māori All Blacks players
Rugby New York players